Bernie is the surname of:

 Ben Bernie (1891–1943), American jazz violinist, bandleader and radio personality
 Dave Bernie (born 1948), Irish retired hurler
 Melvyn Bernie, founder of Mel Bernie Company, a manufacturer and wholesaler of costume jewelry and novelties

See also
 Burnie (surname)
 Burney (surname)